Amby or AMBY may refer to:

 Amby (Maastricht), a neighbourhood in Maastricht, the Netherlands
 Amby, Queensland, a town in Australia
 A diminutive of Ambrose (given name)
 AMBY, a blog and YouTube channel hosted by Alicia Atout